Sandy Bacher is a former wrestling champion and Olympic level judo competitor.

In judo, Bacher would compete in the 1992, 1996 and 2000 Olympic Games but did not win a medal. She did get a bronze at 1999 Pan American games.

In the World Wrestling Championships Bacher would win the silver in 1997, bronze in 1998, and a gold in 1999.

References

Living people
American female judoka
American wrestlers
Olympic judoka of the United States
Pan American Games medalists in judo
Year of birth missing (living people)
Pan American Games bronze medalists for the United States
Judoka at the 1992 Summer Olympics
Judoka at the 1996 Summer Olympics
Judoka at the 2000 Summer Olympics
Judoka at the 1999 Pan American Games
Medalists at the 1999 Pan American Games
21st-century American women